Lyttonsville is a light rail station that is currently under construction in the Lyttonsville neighborhood of Silver Spring, Maryland. It will be part of the Purple Line in Maryland. The station will be located at Lyttonsville Place.

History 
The Purple Line is under construction as of 2022 and is scheduled to open in 2026.

Station layout
The station consists of an island platform just north of the Lyttonsville Place overpass. It will feature steel girders from the historic Talbot Avenue bridge.

References

Purple Line (Maryland)
Railway stations scheduled to open in 2026
Railway stations in Montgomery County, Maryland
Outer Silver Spring, Maryland